Kincheng Banking Corporation or Kincheng Bank was a bank in Hong Kong. It was established in Tianjin in 1917 by Mr. Zhou Zuomin (a native of Huai'an in Jiangsu), Mr. Ni Sichong (Anhui General Commander) and Mr. Wang Zhilong (Ni's treasurer). Kincheng Banking Corporation, Yien Yieh Commercial Bank, Continental Bank and China & South Sea Bank were called "four northern banks" in 1920s in China.

In 1952, it was grouped into the "Joint Office of Joint Public-Private Banks" with other 8 Chinese banks. In 2001, it was merged to form Bank of China (Hong Kong).

See others 

Four Northern Banks

References

Defunct banks of China
Defunct banks of Hong Kong
Bank of China
Companies based in Tianjin
Banks established in 1917
Banks disestablished in 2001